Harto the Borges is a documentary film by Eduardo Montes-Bradley. Harto the Borges explores the narcissistic side of Jorge Luis Borges, the author of El Aleph, his frequent and often criticized comments to the press, his distinctive and gentle ironies. Harto The Borges had a theatrical release in Buenos Aires in September 2000, and was well received by the critics. Since then has been frequently exhibited at forums, campuses, and film festivals. On October 4, 2011, Harto the Borges was presented at the University of Salamanca, and made available to the general audience in Argentina through the On Line version of  Revista Cultura Ñ, (Diario Clarin) in Buenos Aires. The film was released alongside an article in which the director views the film ten years after its premier at the Cine Cosmos. The film is currently available in Vimeo. Harto the Borges was presented at the Festival Internacional del Nuevo Cine Latinoamericano, Havana, Cuba, 2000 and nominated for Premio Cóndor de Plata.

Synopsis
 Borges emerges as a counterpoint to the interviewees, some of which evoke scandal and most of which cut through stereotypes and presuppositions surrounding this key figure. The title of the film is a direct reference to the poem "Borges and I", slightly modified to pay a tribute to the writer's billings. The strategy employed by Montes-Bradley when it comes to Borges, a writer of whom almost everything has been said, consists on giving the word to the writer himself and to a select group of intellectuals who dwell on the margins of the Argentine cultural aparatik. Montes-Bradley, however, does not exhibit Borges like a painting to be admired but rather as a counterpoint to the observations of others. We are neither the hapless witnesses of another saccharine celebration of Jorge Luis Borges, nor are we forced to endure another fashionable defrocking of an idol. The Borges that emerges from the interaction of the testimonies in this documentary surges from the heat of the debate, from the strong opinions, some certainly scandalous, most politically incorrect. On the tenth anniversary of its theatrical release, Montes-Bradley writes an opinion column on Diario Clarín with considerations about the film in retrospective.

Review and quotes

"El documental de Eduardo Montes Bradley Harto de Borges, con variados testimonios y material de
archivo, aporta una mirada crítica sobre la veneración al escritor. Sin embargo, en su afán desmitificador agiganta su fantasma."

"Harto the Borges grabs and holds the audience from the beginning with a strong documentary style. Montes-Bradley owns a nervous and inquisitive camera with multiple suggestive angles to explore the other side of Borges"
| La Nación, Buenos Aires, September 19, 2000.

"In Harto the Borges Montes-Bradley crafts a documentary as intelligent and provocative as the subject it portraits"| Clarín, "De ideas y paradojas"., Buenos Aires, October 14, 2000.

Billing block
Harto the Borges was made possible with a grant from the National Institute of Cinema and Audiovisual Arts. Produced by Iruña Films (Argentina). Producer: Soledad Liendo. Associate Producer Sara Kaplan. Direct Sound: Jadur Mantecón. Soundmix: Mario Fachinsky and Gaspar Schever. Animation scenes designed by Vicky Biagiola and Liliana Romero. Lab:  DuArt (New York), Continental Film (Miami), and Videocolor (Buenos Aires). Offline BIN CINE. Color by Gustavo Gorzanczany. Masterization: Accord Productions, Miami. Final credits thank the University of Virginia, University of Notre Dame, University of Texas at Austin, Instituto Español de Cooperación, Universidad de Salamanca, Gianni Mina, and others. Directed and edited by Eduardo Montes-Bradley.

Interviews and locations
A number of interviews were filmed in Super 16mm, and digital DV using cameras Aaton, and Sony VX1000. Interviews were conducted by Montes-Bradley on location in Buenos Aires with Jorge Luis Borges, Ariel Dorfman, Horacio Gonzalez, Christian Ferrer, Martín Caparrós, and Alejandro Horowicz; Berlin: Osvaldo Bayer; Turin: Franco Lucentini and Paolo Collo; Montevideo: Luis Sepúlveda. Other locations: Geneva, Paris.

Awards and honors 
 Official Selection. 12e Rencontres Cinémas d'Amerique Latine. Toulouse, Mars 2000.

References

External links
 
 "Harto the Borges: diez años después". Diario Clarín, October 10, 2011. 
 Internet Movie Database 
 
 La Nación, Film Review "Un intento por demistificar al maestro"  
 Diario Clarín, Film Review "De ideas y paradojas" 
  Diario Clarín

2000 films
Argentine independent films
2000s Spanish-language films
Documentary films about writers
Jorge Luis Borges
Argentine documentary films
2000 documentary films
Films directed by Eduardo Montes-Bradley
2000 independent films
2000s Argentine films